Lernerneset is a headland at the northwestern coast of Abel Island in Kong Karls Land, Svalbard. The headland is named after German Arctic explorer Theodor Lerner. A former variant of the name was Kap Lerner.

References

Headlands of Svalbard
Abel Island